Vilén may refer to:
4514 Vilen, an asteroid
 Vilén, a pseudonym used by Vladimir Lenin in Finland

People with the surname
 Jari Vilén, Finnish Minister of Foreign Trade (2002–2003)
 Erik Wilén or Erik Vilén, silver-medalist at the 1924 Summer Olympics
 Margareta Wilén, from 1961 Steinby, Finnish archaeologist and professor

People with the given name
 Vilen Kolouta, Armenian cinematographer/sound mixer
 Vilen Galstyan, Armenian actor